Ittaqullah is an Arabic word or word-phrase composed of the words "Ittaqu" (the command or imperative form of the word taqwa), and "Allah".  It is found in several verses in the Quran, and appears often in Muslim literature.

It has been translated variously as "fear God", "keep your duty to Allah and fear Him", "guard your duty to Allah", "be careful of (your duty to) Allah", "be pious to Allah", "be aware of Allah",  to "love and be faithful to", as well as fear Allah, "piety".

An Islamic encyclopedia explains:

References

Arabic words and phrases
Quranic words and phrases